Robert Cawdron (29 December 1921 – 14 September 1997) was a French-born British film and television actor. Often cast as police officers, he had a long-running role on Dixon of Dock Green as Detective Inspector Cherry.

Selected filmography

Film

 Night Beat (1947) - Police Recruit (uncredited)
 The Fallen Idol (1948) - Policeman (uncredited)
 The Chiltern Hundreds (1949) - Sergeant
 Stage Fright (1950) - Policeman (uncredited)
 State Secret (1950) - State Policeman (uncredited)
 The Elusive Pimpernel (1950) - Doorman at the French Embassy (uncredited)
 Highly Dangerous (1950) - Soldier at Barrier During Fire (uncredited)
 Captain Horatio Hornblower (1951) - French Mate on 'Witch of Endor' (uncredited)
 Trent's Last Case (1952) - Police Constable (uncredited)
 Down Among the Z Men (1952) - Sergeant Bullshine
 Street of Shadows (1953) - Det. Sgt. Hadley
 Five on a Treasure Island (1957) - Luke Undown
 A King in New York (1957) - U.S. Marshal
 The One That Got Away (1957) - Officer on Horseback (uncredited)
 Identity Unknown (1960) - Flynn
 October Moth (1960) - The Policeman
 Saturday Night and Sunday Morning (1960) - Robboe
 Ali and the Camel (1960) - (voice)
 Feet of Clay (1960) - Saunders
 The Frightened City (1961) - Nero
 Crosstrap (1962) - Joe
 We Joined the Navy (1962) - Marcel's Bar Patron (uncredited)
 The Fighting Prince of Donegal (1966)
 The Shuttered Room (1967) - John Whately, Susannah's Father
 The Blood Beast Terror (1968) - Chief Constable
 The Private Life of Sherlock Holmes (1970) - Hotel Manager
 Zeppelin (1971) - Officer (uncredited)
 Madhouse (1974) - CID Inspector (uncredited)
 S*P*Y*S (1974) - Vet (uncredited)

Television

 Dixon of Dock Green (1955-1965) - Det. Insp. Cherry / Insp. Gordon
 The Adventures of the Scarlet Pimpernel (1955) - Chicon / First Agent
 The Count of Monte Cristo (1956) - Rico
 Assignment Foreign Legion (1956) - Bolieau
 Sailor of Fortune (1956-1957) - Patron / Demitrios
 Shadow Squad (1957) - Sgt. Telfer
 White Hunter (1957-1958) - Paul Klinger / Doug Gordon
 Educated Evans (1958) - Second Military Policeman
 Ivanhoe (1958) - Sir Mark / Sir Edgar / Bailiff
 Starr and Company (1958) - Marvin Lavery
 The New Adventures of Charlie Chan (1958) - Rodney Ames / Inspector Von Der Reyden
 The Four Just Men (1959) - Farmer
 Golden Girl (1961) - Det. Supt. Tallerton
 Sir Francis Drake (1961) - Crombie
 Bootsie and Snudge (1962) - Ned Plackett
 No Hiding Place (1962) - Michael O'Grady
 The Saint (1962-1967) - Sergeant Le Duc
 Espionage (1963) - Paratrooper
 Call the Gun Expert (1964) - PC Gutteridge
 The Massingham Affair (1964) - PC Hugh
 199 Park Lane (1965) - Stuart Long
 The Avengers (1966-1967) - Banks / Horace
 Triton (1968) - Robert Fulton
 Department S (1969) - Police Inspector
 Pegasus (1969) - Robert Fulton
 Doctor Who (1970) - Taltalian
 The Main Chance (1970) - Crispin
 From a Bird's Eye View (1970-1971) - Uncle Bert Quigley / Charlie Duggan
 Doomwatch (1971) - John McAlister
 Owen, M.D. (1971) - Andrew Pearce
 The Persuaders! (1971) - Leyland
 The Prince of Denmark (1974) - Customer
 The Dick Emery Show (1974-1981)

References

Bibliography 
 Paul Cornell, Martin Day & Keith Topping. The Guinness Book of Classic British TV. Guinness, 1996.

External links 
 
 Robert Cawdron at Theatricalia

1921 births
1997 deaths
British male film actors
British male television actors
French emigrants to the United Kingdom